The 2022–23 Japan Rugby League One – Division 1 season is the twentieth top flight league season scheduled to be played in December 2022 through to 2023, in the newly rebranded Japan Rugby League One. The competition consists of twelve teams, including two promoted teams from Division 2, Sagamihara Dynaboars and Hanazono Liners.

Format
The format and schedule was announced on 16 September 2022. It will consist of a round-robin fixture, before entering into a knockout style play-off for the final four teams. It will feature two conferences (A, B). Teams in each conference will play the teams in their respective conference twice (one at home, one away), and six matches against all the teams in the other conference, three being at home and three away. Each team will play a total of sixteen seasonal fixtures, plus additional play-off matches, including relegation play-offs.

Teams and personnel

Personnel changes

Ladder

Fixtures
Each team were to play five teams twice and six teams once for a total of sixteen home and away matches.

Relegation play-offs
 The relegation play-offs are set to take place between 5 May and 14 May 2022.

Overview

Season play-offs
Bracket

References

External links
 Japan Rugby League One site

2022 rugby union tournaments for clubs
Current rugby union seasons
2022–23 in Japanese rugby union
2023 rugby union tournaments for clubs
2022-23